The Acura TSX is a compact executive car manufactured by Honda and sold through its Acura division from 2003 to 2014. The TSX spanned two generations, both derived from the corresponding Japanese/European versions of the Honda Accord, which were more compact and sporting-oriented than its larger North American counterpart, the latter platform which also used for the Acura TL which slotted above the TSX in Acura's lineup. All TSXs were built in Sayama, Saitama, Japan.

The first-generation TSX was introduced as a 2004 model in April 2003 as a rebadged version of the Japanese domestic market (JDM) Honda Accord 2.4 Type-S, with the exception of its interior, borrowed from the JDM fourth-generation Honda Inspire. It was succeeded by the second-generation TSX, introduced in March 2008 as a 2009 model and based on the eighth-generation JDM Accord. Notably, the final generation of the TSX would introduce a V6 option for 2010, and a wagon for 2011.

It was sold in North America under the Acura luxury marque as the replacement for the Integra sedan which was discontinued in 2001 (1996 in Canada since the EL was the Integra sedan's replacement there), and would become Acura's entry-level vehicle after the Acura RSX got discontinued in 2006. From the 2007 model year until 2012, the TSX was the smallest vehicle in the Acura model line, other than the Civic-based CSX and the preceding Acura 1.6 and 1.7 EL sold only in Canada. In 2013, the smaller ILX was introduced in both the United States and Canada, based upon the Civic platform (replacing the CSX in Canada). 

Honda discontinued the TSX and the larger TL during 2014 with the introduction of the TLX, which replaced both vehicles, although the TLX is close in size to the TL while the recently-introduced ILX succeeded the TSX as Acura's entry-level offering.

First generation (CL9; 2003)

Overview

The Acura TSX was introduced at the 2003 North American International Auto Show as a production model. The 2004 model year TSX's powertrain consisted of a 2.4-liter inline four-cylinder K24A2 engine which produced 200 horsepower, a six-speed manual transmission (which featured a special casing, to reduce weight), and a front wheel drive layout. A five-speed automatic transmission was a no-cost option in the U.S. based on MSRP; however, such was not the case in Canada.

In 2006, the TSX was updated with slight tweaks to the engine (adding 5 hp with an increase from 200 hp to 205 hp); a sportier exterior styling featuring a slightly new front and rear treatment,  standard side skirts, and standard, integral fog lights; and restyled wheels.

In 2007, Tire Pressure Monitoring System and an improved electronic rear view mirror were added, and the 2008 model year brought a new color option.

Interior

2005 was the second year of the TSX and Acura updated it with XM Satellite Radio, a four-way power passenger seat and illuminated the steering wheel-mounted audio and cruise controls. Along with the slight tweaks to the engine in 2006, interior tech features were also added, including a Multi-information Display (MID) in the instrument panel, and luxury features such as a two-position memory for the driver's seat adjustments which adjusted according to which of two keys were being used, auxiliary MP3 player input and Bluetooth-compatible HandsFreeLink (for cellular phones). The Bluetooth HandsFreeLink system operates through voice control, where the user speaks when the HandsFreeLink button is pressed. Six different phones can be paired up to the HandsFreeLink system.

Safety
In testing conducted by the United States-based Insurance Institute for Highway Safety (IIHS), the Acura TSX received an overall rating of "Good" for frontal offset testing, an overall rating of "Poor" rear crash protection, and an overall rating of "Acceptable" for side impact testing.

Engine
The K24A2 engine used in the TSX was related to the engine in the Honda Accord (7th generation), the Honda CR-V, and the Honda Element. The K24A2 featured intelligent variable valve timing (i-VTEC) and produced  in this iteration. Another feature of the i-VTEC system on the TSX and RSX-s was that, unlike other Honda K-series motors, variable timing was used on both the intake and exhaust cams in its three rocker design.

For the 2006 model year, the K24A2 was updated to produce 205 hp (153 kW). The diameter of the throttle body and intake valves were slightly increased, along with the cam duration and valve lift.

Second generation (CU2; 2008)

Overview

The redesigned 2009 Acura TSX made its debut at the New York International Auto Show on March 20, 2008 before going on sale on April 24.

Making its debut on the new TSX is Honda's Advanced Compatibility Engineering body structure, which is designed to reduce accident impact on occupants. In the United States, the TSX comes standard with luxury features like leather seat upholstery, dual-zone climate control, power driver's seat with memory, sunroof, Xenon headlights, and adds a USB port music interface; in Canada this configuration is known as the "Premium Package" as there is a base trim available with the four-cylinder TSX that has cloth seats and halogen headlights, and without the USB connector, memory seat function, and fog lamps. The TSX has an optional technology package, which includes a navigation system real-time traffic and weather, and a 10-speaker premium sound system with DVD-audio capabilities.

For the United States, Acura also added a "Sport Wagon" body style of the TSX in fall 2010 as a 2011 model. The wagon is available with the I4 engine and 5-speed automatic.

The 2010 model year TSX added an optional 3.5L 280 hp V6 engine, shared with the Acura TL. It comes standard with the five-speed automatic transmission with paddle shifters and 18-inch alloy wheels, and is available in either Premium or Technology trims.

For the 2011 model year, the TSX received a facelifted grille with horizontal slots.

For the 2012 model year, Acura introduced an all new Special Edition model. The exterior features a more aggressive front spoiler giving it a sporty look, reminiscent of their old sports coupe, the RSX. Other cosmetic upgrades include a rear bumper fascia, side sills, and a "Special Edition" badge on the trunklid. In the cabin, Acura made sport-minded appointments including suede seat inserts with red backing. There is red stitching on the shift knob, seats, and steering wheel, along with red ambient lighting featured on the gauge cluster, overhead lighting, and footwell lighting. The pedals have also been upgraded to aluminum.

In late 2013 Honda announced that the TSX would be replaced with the Acura TLX sedan and that they will discontinue sales of the TSX model in 2014.

Engine
The TSX uses a base engine similar to that of the previous TSX. The engine is a 2.4-liter in-line 4-cylinder engine reaching 201 hp (150 kW) and  torque. While the rated power of the new TSX engine is  lower than that of the 2008 model, Acura says the new engine distributes power across a much wider rpm range, which along with the increased torque, provides an increased feeling of power for the driver. The transmission choices remain 5-speed automatic and 6-speed manual, though the automatic version now comes with steering-wheel paddle shifters for optional manual shifting.

The TSX was slated to receive a high-performance 2.2-liter i-DTEC clean turbodiesel engine in the 2010 model year after having already offered it for the CL-series Accord; however, it was later announced that Honda had abandoned its plans to bring diesel engines to the U.S. and Japan in favor of hybrid gasoline-electric powertrains.  Instead, a 280 hp 3.5-liter V6 became available in the 2010 Acura TSX. The TSX V6 is only available with the 5-speed automatic transmission.

2011 TSX Sport Wagon

The Acura TSX Sport Wagon is a badge-engineered version of CL-series Honda Accord Tourer station wagon. The Sport Wagon was unveiled in the 2010 New York Auto Show.  The TSX Sportwagon is mechanically identical to the TSX Sedan, sharing the 201-horsepower Honda K engine 2.4L DOHC inline four-cylinder engine, Sequential SportShift 5-speed automatic transmission, and four-wheel independent sports suspension, however unlike the sedan the Sport Wagon is not offered with the 6-speed manual transmission nor the V6 engine.
 The Sport Wagon offers 60.5 cu-ft of rear cargo area (with rear seats folded down; 25.8 cu-ft with the seats up), rear seats with 60/40 fold-down design.

For the United States market, the 2011 Acura TSX Sport Wagon went on sale starting on December 21, 2010 with a base price of US$30,960 (US$34,610 with Technology Package). Acura Canada said that they would eventually sell the TSX Sport Wagon, citing market conditions as the reason for the delay, but ultimately never marketed it there. While the CL-series Honda Accord Tourer was quite successful in its market of Europe, station wagons were less popular in the United States. The competing Volkswagen Passat wagon and Mercedes C-Class wagons were withdrawn around the same time the TSX Sport Wagon was unveiled, leaving the BMW 3 Series Touring as the only wagon available in the entry-level luxury car category.

Changes to 2012 TSX Sport Wagon include a compact tire repair kit that allows for a significantly larger underfloor storage area.

2012 TSX Special Edition
The 2012 TSX Special Edition is a version of the TSX commemorating the 25th anniversary of Acura, with a 6-speed manual or Sequential SportShift 5-speed automatic transmission, a more aggressive front spoiler, rear bumper fascia and side sills, 17x7.5-inch 5-spoke aluminum wheels with a dark grey finish, a "Special Edition" badge on the trunklid, perforated black Lux Suede inserts and red backing upholstery, unique red stitching and red-lighting throughout the interior, aluminum pedal covers and a black headliner material replaces the standard grey headliner used on other TSX models.

The Technology package includes ELS audio system and hard-drive based navigation system.

The TSX Special Edition was unveiled in 2011 Orange County International Auto Show.

In Canada, a very similar model to the US model SE, was also released. It shared the same features as the American model, but was officially called an A Spec trim. It had an A Spec badge on each fender, and came with unique 18” multi spoke alloy wheels were both silver and dark grey

Safety
The Insurance Institute for Highway Safety (IIHS) found the 2009-11 TSX to have an overall driver death of 7 deaths per million registered years, the 2nd lowest of midsize four-door cars, and both single-vehicle crash death rate and rollover death rate of 0.

Awards and recognition
 2008 Wheels Car of the Year award winner.
 2009 Car of the Year Finalist, Motor Trend.
 Ranked best resale value in the Sedan category in CNN's "Best Resale Value Cars" article on November 29, 2006.
 The Acura TSX was on Car and Driver'''s Ten Best list in its first three years of production (2004–2006).
 Top-Value Car of 2004 in the Category: Sedan under $35,000 from SmartMoney.com.
 It has received the "Frontal Five Star Rating" from the U.S. National Highway Traffic Safety Administration's frontal crash tests.
 "Best Pick" in a Frontal Impact from the Insurance Institute for Highway Safety.
 In November 2004, the TSX earned Consumer Reports' "Recommended" mark; in addition they named the car "Best Overall" in tests of four sporty sedans. (may require online subscription) In April 2007, the magazine rated the used TSX a "Good Bet."
 In the IIHS crash tests, the 2nd generation TSX received Good overall marks in both front and side impact crash tests and the Good score in all 14 measured categories. The IIHS gave the TSX its "Best Pick" accolade.
 Best upscale small car for families 2011, U.S. News & World Report''.
 AutoPacific's most ideal midsized luxury car, 2012

Racing
Realtime Racing prepares a factory TSX to compete in the SCCA Pro Racing World Challenge GTS class. The factory TSX is refashioned to be stiffer and lighter, and includes motor work with raised compression, and a custom built sequential transmission.
Acura won the Manufacturer's Championship for the Touring class in 2005 with the RTR TSX, as well as the Driver's Championship for Peter Cunningham. Acura returned in 2006 and won the Manufacturers' Championship of the Speed World Challenge Touring Car class for the second year in a row, running both RSXs and TSXs. TSX drivers finished in 3rd and 4th in the Drivers' Championship.
More success followed as Pierre Kleinubing won the Championship in 2007, and Peter Cunningham took it in 2008.
Driving for RTR in 2009 is Peter Cunningham, Pierre Kleinubing, Toby Grahovic, Kuno Wittmer, and Jeff Courtney.

Sales

References and footnotes

External links

 Official American site
 TSXClub is dedicated to Acura TSX Sport Sedan

TSX
Compact cars
Compact executive cars
Front-wheel-drive vehicles
Sports sedans
2010s cars
Cars introduced in 2003
Station wagons